Rakovac may refer to:

People
 Rakovac, a Croatian surname
 Dragutin Rakovac (1813–1854), Croatian writer, translator and journalist
 Ladislav Rakovac (1847–1906), Croatian physician

Geography
 Serbia
Rakovac (Beočin)
Rakovac (Bujanovac)
Rakovac (Novi Pazar)
Rakovac (Raška)
Rakovac Monastery

 Bosnia and Herzegovina
Rakovac (Novi Grad)
Rakovac (Bratunac)
Rakovac (Pale)

Serbo-Croatian place names